Basildon Town Football Club is a football club based in Basildon, England. They are currently members of the Eastern Counties League Division One South and play at Rookery Hill, Corringham.

History
Formed as South Basildon & Vange in 1946, the club entered the Grays & District Minor League in 1947, renaming themselves to Basildon Town a year later whilst in the Southend & District League. In 1953, following stints in the Thurrock Combination and South Essex League, Basildon Town joined the Parthenon League, joining the London League in 1955. In 1964, the club merged with Pitsea United to form Basildon & Pitsea, becoming founder members of the Essex Olympian League in 1966. Two years later, the club reconstituted back to Basildon Town. During the 1970s, Basildon Town played in the Basildon & District League and Southend & District League, before rejoining the Essex Olympian League in 1981. 

In 2022, after winning the Essex Olympian League, the club was admitted into the Eastern Counties League Division One South.

Ground
Upon formation, the club played at Stacey's Corner in Basildon. In 1959, Basildon Town moved to Burnt Mills Road in the town, later moving to Gun Meadow in Pitsea in 1964. In 1972, the club returned to Basildon, playing at Eversley Road. In 1985, the club moved to the Basildon Sports & Leisure Club.

In 2021, Basildon Town began groundsharing with Basildon United at their ground in Gardiners Close, with the reserves remaining at the Basildon Sports & Leisure Club. In 2022, it was announced the club would enter a groundsharing agreement with East Thurrock United at Rookery Hill.

References

Borough of Basildon
Association football clubs established in 1946
1946 establishments in England
Football clubs in England
Football clubs in Essex
South Essex League
Parthenon League
London League (football)
Essex Olympian Football League
Eastern Counties Football League